In My Element is an album by jazz pianist and composer Robert Glasper, released on the Blue Note label on March 20, 2007.  The album is Glasper's second for Blue Note.

Track listing
All songs composed by Robert Glasper except as indicated.
"G&B" – 8:29
"Of Dreams to Come" – 8:11
"F.T.B." – 5:57
"Y'outta Praise Him (Intro)" (Glasper, Tribett) – 3:35
"Y'outta Praise Him" – 6:46
"Beatrice" (Sam Rivers) – 8:56
"Medley: Maiden Voyage / Everything in Its Right Place" (Herbie Hancock / Radiohead) – 8:43
"J Dillalude" (Glasper, James Yancey) – 4:26
"Silly Rabbit" – 7:20
"One for 'Grew" – 6:33
"Tribute" – 3:43

Charts

Personnel
Musicians
 Robert Glasper – piano
 Vicente Archer – bass
 Damion Reid – drums
 Reverend Joe Ratliff – spoken word on "Tribute"

Production
 Robert Glasper – producer
 Eli Wolf – producer
 Joe Marciano – engineer (recording, mixing, mastering)
 Maz Ross – assistant engineer

References

Post-bop albums
2007 albums
Robert Glasper albums
Blue Note Records albums